Isaac "Chair" Kaliati (born 8 April 1998) is a Malawian international footballer who plays for South African Premier League club Cape Town City, as a winger.

Club career

Azam Tigers F.C.
Kaliati began his career at Blantyre-based club Azam Tigers, first in the youth ranks before making his professional debut at 16. After a breakout season in the Malawi Premier Division as well as consistent performances for the Malawian U20 National Team, he was signed by Malawian champions, Mighty Wanderers F.C.

Mighty Wanderers F.C.
As one of Malawi's most high-profile "wonderkids", Isaac was signed by Wanderers over competing interest from Big Bullets FC. He was an influential player in both the 2015 and 2016 seasons, guiding Wanderers to domestic cup glory in 2015.

Cape Town City F.C.
Isaac's first big move was announced on 31 March 2017 when he signed for South African Premier League cup champions Cape Town City at just 18 years old. Under the guidance of head coach Eric Tinkler, Isaac will look to forge what is touted to be a very promising career in Africa's most competitive league.

International career
He made his international debut for Malawi in a 1-0 victory over Uganda on 6 July 2015 at just 17 years old. He has since featured regularly for the national team and has been touted as one of the finest footballing prospects to come out of Malawi.

Honours

Club
Mighty Wanderers
Carlsberg Malawi Cup: 2015

Individual
Malawian Young Player of the Year: 2015
Malawian Player of the Year: 2016

References

External links
 
 

1998 births
Living people
Malawian footballers
Malawi international footballers
Cape Town City F.C. (2016) players
Association football forwards
Malawian expatriate footballers
Malawian expatriate sportspeople in South Africa
Expatriate soccer players in South Africa
Malawi under-20 international footballers
Mighty Wanderers FC players
People from Blantyre